"The Charade" (previously known as "Charades") is a song by Armenian-American musician Serj Tankian. The single was released prior to Elect the Dead Symphony, although the rock version was found only in the album's DVD closing credits. The orchestral version featured on the album's CD is included in the single as a B-side on some versions.

Release history 
The song has a long release history. Its live debut took place in 2004 on the Axis of Justice tour. Here, the song was performed as a piano piece with vocals. This version appeared on Axis of Justice: Concert Series Volume 1 as "Charades".

"Charades" was later considered for release on System of a Down's Mezmerize/Hypnotize double album. Footage found on the DualDisc version of Hypnotize shows the band recording it, but the song didn't make the final release. In 2007, after System of a Down went on hiatus, Tankian began performing as a solo artist backed by the Flying Cunts of Chaos. The subsequent Elect the Dead tour marked the song's debut in the arrangement later found on the single.

The orchestral arrangement made its debut during the Elect the Dead Symphony tour under its new title "The Charade". The resulting single was the only one released in support of the album. The album was intended as a reimagining of songs from Elect the Dead, though neither "The Charade" nor "Gate 21" were featured on the original album. "Gate 21", however, saw a studio release on Tankian's next album.

Both rock and orchestral arrangements have been played live since.

Music video 
A video of Tankian performing the orchestral version can be found on the Elect the Dead Symphony DVD. A video of the orchestral version of "Empty Walls", also found on the DVD, was uploaded to Serj's YouTube account. The featured version was released as a B-side on some versions of the single.

Track listing

References 

Serj Tankian songs
2010 singles
Songs written by Serj Tankian
2010 songs
Reprise Records singles